The Wreckage may refer to:

 The Wreckage (Ocean Park, Washington), a log house
 The Wreckage, the debut album by Candlelight Red
 The Wreckage (album)), by American country singer Will Hoge
 "The Wreckage", a song by Throw the Fight from the album In Pursuit of Tomorrow, 2008